General elections were held in the Netherlands on 7 July 1948. The Catholic People's Party remained the largest party in the House of Representatives, winning 32 of the 100 seats.

Following the elections, a broad four-party coalition government was formed between the Catholic People's Party, Labour Party, Christian Historical Union and People's Party for Freedom and Democracy. Combined these parties held 76% of the available seats in parliament.

Results

References

General elections in the Netherlands
Netherlands
General
Netherlands